The Zira FK 2022-23 season is Zira's eighth Azerbaijan Premier League season, and ninth season in their history.

Season events
On 29 December, Zira announced the departure of Tamkin Khalilzade by mutual agreement.

On 25 January, Zira announced the signing of Vladyslav Kulach to an 18-month contract from Dynamo Kyiv.

On 29 January, Zira announced the signing of Wilde-Donald Guerrier to a six-month contract, with the option of an additional year, from Olympiakos Nicosia.

On 4 February, Zira announced the signing of Abbas Ibrahim to a two-and-a-half year contract, with the option of an additional year, from Paços de Ferreira.

On 11 February, Zira announced the signing of Eldar Kuliyev to a three-and-a-half year contract, from Mynai.

On 15 February, Ilkin Muradov joined Sabail on loan for the remainder of the season.

Squad

Transfers

In

Loans in

Out

Loans out

Released

Friendlies

Competitions

Overview

Premier League

Results summary

Results by round

Results

League table

Azerbaijan Cup

UEFA Europa Conference League

Qualifying phase

Squad statistics

Appearances and goals

|-
|colspan="14"|Players away on loan:

|-
|colspan="14"|Players who left Zira during the season:

|}

Goal scorers

Clean sheets

Disciplinary record

References

Azerbaijani football clubs 2022–23 season